Thomas Walker (born 23 December 1964) was a Scottish footballer who played for Ayr United, Dumbarton, Stranraer and Albion Rovers.

References

1964 births
Scottish footballers
Dumbarton F.C. players
Stranraer F.C. players
Albion Rovers F.C. players
Ayr United F.C. players
Scottish Football League players
Living people
Association football forwards